Thomasian is an eponymous noun or adjective denoting that which is of, or related to, one of the following: 

Thomas Aquinas
Christian Thomasius
Dylan Thomas
Students of University of Santo Tomas
A Resident of St. Thomas's Hall in Madras Christian College